The Dalton Woodson House is a historic house at 107 West Arch Avenue in Searcy, Arkansas.  It is a single-story brick building, in a picturesque interpretation of English Revival architecture.  It is a side gable roof that extends across a porte-cochere with an arched opening, set next to a similar arched opening providing access to a recessed secondary entry.  A cross gable extends across the centers of these two arches, and there is a smaller and steeper arch above the main entrance, which is set between the right arch and a chimney with stepped stone shoulders.  The house was built in 1929, and is one of the city's finest examples of English Revival architecture.

The house was listed on the National Register of Historic Places in 1991.

See also
National Register of Historic Places listings in White County, Arkansas

References

Houses on the National Register of Historic Places in Arkansas
Houses completed in 1929
Houses in Searcy, Arkansas
National Register of Historic Places in Searcy, Arkansas
1929 establishments in Arkansas
Tudor Revival architecture in Arkansas